John William Foster (1745 – January 1809), of Rosy Park, was an Anglo-Irish volunteer and politician.

He was the grandson of John Foster of Dunleer, MP for Dunleer and Elizabeth, née Fortescue. Foster was appointed High Sheriff of Louth for 1776 and then elected member to the Irish House of Commons for Dunleer in 1783 and held this seat until 1790. His parents were William Foster and Patience Fowke who married in 1743.

Foster married 1788, Rebecca (b.c. 1764  d. 1853) only child of Hamilton McClure,. Esq., of Dublin, and died 1809.

He was ancestor of the Foster family of Ballymascanlon.

References

1745 births
1809 deaths
18th-century Anglo-Irish people
Irish MPs 1783–1790
Members of the Parliament of Ireland (pre-1801) for County Louth constituencies
Politicians from County Louth
High Sheriffs of County Louth